Battonya is a town in Békés County, in the Southern Great Plain region of south-east Hungary. Residents are Magyars, with minority of Serbs and Romanians.

Geography
It covers an area of 145.77 km2 and has a population of 5960 people (2015).

History 

After the Ottoman occupation until 1918, BATTONYA was part of the Austrian monarchy, province of Hungary; in Transleithania after the compromise of 1867 in the  Kingdom of Hungary.

The Jews in the city 
The Jewish community in the city was established in the second half of the 19th century and most of the Jews in the settlement were merchants and industrialists.

The synagogue was built in 1896 and the community had a Jewish school.

In 1942, young Jews from the city were sent to forced labor.

In 1944, after the Germans entered Hungary, the head of the congregation and some of the community's dignitaries were arrested, and on May 13, all the local Jews were rounded up and finally transferred to Békéscsaba. Most of them were taken to the Auschwitz extermination camp.

After the war, three survivors returned from Auschwitz, six from forced labor and eighty from Austria. The community was reorganized, but many dispersed within a short time. In the 1970s, only a few Jews lived there.

Twin towns – sister cities
Battonya is twinned with:

  Pecica, Romania (1996)
  Beočin, Serbia (1997)
  Lipova, Romania (1997)

References

External links

  in Hungarian

Populated places in Békés County
Hungary–Romania border crossings
Romanian communities in Hungary
Serb communities in Hungary
Jewish communities destroyed in the Holocaust